Paul F. Little (born August 10, 1956) is an American pornographic actor, producer and director better known by his stage name Max Hardcore. He rose to prominence in 1992 with the film series The Anal Adventures of Max Hardcore, which in 1994 was awarded the X-Rated Critics Organization's award for Best Amateur or Pro-Am series. Former AVN writer, Gerrie Lim, has classified Hardcore's works as gonzo pornography and "testing the limits of acceptability". He is a member of the X-Rated Critics Organization's Hall of Fame. He spent two and a half years in prison (2009–2011), convicted in a trial for obscenity.

Nature of content

Max Hardcore's films generally consist of sexual acts executed by himself, with women, often porn industry newcomers who act like girls or their upset mothers.

The sexual situations depicted in Max Hardcore's films frequently include acts such as urinating on his female co-stars, fisting them, or inserting specula into their anuses or vaginas and widening them to extreme degree. There are also scenes wherein the actresses, at his direction, vomit or blow mucus into their mouths or on themselves, or drink urine from their anuses using a tube. Films by Max Hardcore often depict their director and star inflicting apparent pain and humiliation on his co-stars.

The treatment by Hardcore of his female co-stars has been described by several critics as occasionally abusive and the tone of Hardcore's work has been considered misogynistic. His films and alleged work methods have reportedly made him relatively unpopular in the porn industry.

Max and actress Layla Rivera appeared on the Howard Stern show in September 2007.

Prosecutions and post-prison
Based on Max Extreme 4, the city of Los Angeles in 1998 charged him with child pornography and distribution of obscenity. That the actress was over the age of 18 was not disputed; charges were brought because the actress was portraying a character who was underage. Just before the case was brought to trial in 2002, the U.S. Supreme Court ruled (in Ashcroft v. Free Speech Coalition) that the statute prohibiting adults from portraying children in films and books was unconstitutional. Based on this ruling, the child pornography charges against Little were dismissed. The misdemeanor charge of distribution of obscenity was retained, but the jury failed to reach a verdict. An additional obscenity charge was subsequently levied against him by L.A., again resulting in a hung jury. Little commented after the trial that it "was a frivolous waste of public resources."

On October 5, 2005, while Little was in Barcelona to attend an international FICEB Erotic Expo, the offices of Max World Entertainment were raided by the FBI. Five video titles and the office's computer servers were seized, ostensibly for research toward a federal obscenity indictment or a charge related to the record-keeping law (18 U.S.C. 2257).

After the FBI raid, Little released the following statement:

In 2007, Little and his company, Max World Entertainment, Inc., were indicted in Florida by the United States Department of Justice Child Exploitation and Obscenity Section with five counts of transporting obscene matter by use of an interactive computer service and five counts of mailing obscene matter, relating to five movies showing fisting, urination and vomiting. Little was subsequently found guilty on all charges and sentenced to 46 months in prison. On appeal, the 11th Circuit Court in Atlanta, Georgia upheld the conviction, ruling that materials published online can be judged by local community standards in Florida even though Hardcore did not live there or produce the materials there.  Little began serving his sentence on January 29, 2009.

The jury ordered the internet domain www.MaxHardcore.com to be forfeited but declined to forfeit Little's house in Altadena, California.

Little was originally assigned to the Federal Metropolitan Correctional Facility in downtown Los Angeles, and then transferred to Federal Correctional Institution, La Tuna in Anthony, Texas, a low-security correctional facility for men. He served the final five months of his sentence under house arrest.

Awards
 1994 Anal Adventures of Max Hardcore was the winner in the XRCO's category Best Amateur or Pro-Am Series.
 1996 Max 8: The Fugitive was the winner in the XRCO's category Best Male-Female Scene.
 2009 Admitted to XRCO's Hall of Fame, in the category "Outlaws of Porn".

Popular culture
Little is a subject of the 1998 David Foster Wallace essay Big Red Son, which analyzes the American pornographic industry of the 1990s.

References

External links

 
 
 

1956 births
American male pornographic film actors
American pornographic film directors
American pornographic film producers
American prisoners and detainees
Living people
People convicted of obscenity
Businesspeople from Racine, Wisconsin
Pornographic film actors from Wisconsin
Prisoners and detainees of the United States federal government
Criminals from Wisconsin
Film directors from Wisconsin